Amol Anil Muzumdar (born 11 November 1974) is an Indian cricketer, domestically, having previously played for Mumbai and Assam. He was primarily a right-handed batsman. He held the record for the most runs scored in the Ranji Trophy, India's premier domestic first-class cricket competition, breaking the record held by Amarjit Kaypee. Despite his jaw-dropping success at the domestic level, he was never selected for the Indian national team.

Career 
Muzumdar attended B.P.M. High School and then switched to Sharadashram Vidyamandir School upon his coach Ramakant Achrekar's request. This is where he became schoolmates and eventually good friends with the future cricketing star Sachin Tendulkar, they were also shared the same coach . When Tendulkar and Vinod Kambli shared in a then-record unbroken 664-run partnership for their school in a Harris Shield match, he was on the same team and was due to bat next.

On his first-class debut for Bombay, he scored 260 against Haryana at Faridabad in a Ranji Trophy match in the 1993–94 season. This was a world record for any player on their debut in first-class cricket until it was broken by Ajay Rohera in December 2018.

Muzumdar was named as the vice-captain of the Indian U-19 cricket team for their tour of England in 1994. He was regarded as one of the country's finest prospects and was labelled the "new Tendulkar". He also played for the India A side in the 1994–95 season alongside Rahul Dravid and Sourav Ganguly.

However, despite a first-class career average of over 50, he never seemed to be in the plans of the national team selectors. While his contemporaries Tendulkar, Dravid and Ganguly went on to have long and successful international careers, he was never selected for the full India national cricket team in either Tests or ODIs.

Muzumdar hit rock bottom and considered quitting the game in 2002, but since then he has continued to serve the Mumbai cricket team with distinction. In the 2006–07 season, he was appointed captain and led the team to victory in the Ranji Trophy. In January 2007, he became the highest-ever run-scorer in the Ranji Trophy for Mumbai beating the record set by Ashok Mankad.

In September 2009, Amol moved to Assam after being disappointed as he was not selected in the Mumbai squad for the Mushtaq Ali T20 trophy.

In October 2012 he signed with Andhra Pradesh for two years. Midway through the 2013–14 Ranji Trophy he made himself unavailable for the season and instead decided to mentor Andhra Youngsters.

He is one of the unfortunate players who didn't get a chance to play for  India despite him repeatedly excelling in domestic cricket scoring with an average near 50.

Coaching career
Mazumdar was appointed as batting coach for India Under-19 cricket team and India Under- 23 cricket team.

In December 2013, Mazumdar was appointed as batting consultant for Netherlands cricket team.

In 2018, Mazumdar was appointed as the batting coach for Rajasthan Royals for the 2018 IPL.
He was the batting coach for Rajasthan Royals for 3 seasons (2018, 2019, 2020). As of 2021, Muzumdar is still with Rajasthan Royals but now has a different designation.
He is appointed as batting coach (interim) for South African Cricket Team. When South Africa toured India. Muzumdar today is the head coach for the current Mumbai squad.

References

External links

1974 births
Andhra cricketers
Assam cricketers
Indian cricketers
Living people
Mumbai cricketers
Cricketers from Mumbai
West Zone cricketers